Bruno Carvalho Fagundes (born 24 May 1989) is a Brazilian actor.

Career
Fagundes graduated from the Incenna theater school. His television appearances include Negócio da China (2008), Gluom – Piloto (2006), Carga Pesada (2006), O Rei do Gado (1996) and A Viagem (1994). On stage, he has appeared in Os Tagarelas (2004), Viúva, Porém Honesta (2004), Procura-se uma Rosa (2005), Sonho de uma Noite de Verão (2005), Pã (2005), Gente que Faz (2006, in which he performed with his mother Mara Carvalho), A Lua sobre o Tapete (2007). He has also appeared in films such as Fim da Linha (2005), Bellini and the Devil (2006), Quem Sabe (2007) and Chico Talarico: O Documentário (2008).

In 2011, Fagundes also decided to sing and performed in São Paulo at the show Improvável. In 2012 he joined his father, Antônio Fagundes, in the play Vermelho in São Paulo. The montage features a panorama of Russian expatriate painter Mark Rothko (1903–1970) in the United States, played by his father. This one is in crisis with the new times, dominated by people of formation and values different from his, generation represented by the young painter Ken, Bruno's role.

In 2014, he was in the reboot of Rede Globo, Meu Pedacinho de Chão, with the authorship of Benedito Ruy Barbosa.

Personal life
Fagundes was born in São Paulo, Brazil. He is the son of actor and director Antônio Fagundes and actress, director and writer Mara Carvalho.

He has been dating fellow actor Igor Fernandez since 2022, who met during the recording of the telenovela Cara e Coragem.

Filmography

Television

Film

Stage

References

External links
 

1989 births
20th-century Brazilian male actors
21st-century Brazilian male actors
Brazilian male child actors
Brazilian male film actors
Brazilian male telenovela actors
Brazilian male television actors
Brazilian male stage actors
Brazilian gay actors
Living people
Male actors from São Paulo